Damkulakada (Dargwa: Дамкьулакъада) is a rural locality (a selo) in Ayalakabsky Selsoviet, Levashinsky District, Republic of Dagestan, Russia. The population was 49 as of 2010. There are 2 streets.

Geography 
Damkulakada is located 20 km east of Levashi (the district's administrative centre) by road, on the Kakaozen River. Purrimakhi and Shikhshakak are the nearest rural localities.

Nationalities 
Dargins live there.

References 

Rural localities in Levashinsky District